The Achilles was a motorcycle manufactured between 1906 and 1912 in the former Czechoslovakia. The bikes were powered by 3.5 hp single-cylinder and 5 hp V-twin engines built by Fafnir and Zeus.

References

External links
Unrestored 5hp V-twin

Motorcycle manufacturers of Czechoslovakia
Defunct manufacturing companies of Czechoslovakia